The tui chub (Siphateles bicolor) is a cyprinid fish native to western North America. Widespread in many areas, it is an important food source for other fish, including the cutthroat trout.

Range 

The tui chub's range includes the Lahontan and Central system of the Great Basin, as well as the Owens and Mojave Rivers. It is found in the Pit River and Goose Lake of the upper Central Valley, in the Klamath River system, and in the Columbia River drainage.

Description 

The form and appearance of the tui chub is variable; many were originally described as different species by J. O. Snyder, but have since been reduced to subspecies. In general, the color is deep olive above and white below, with a smooth variation in shading along the sides, and a brassy reflection. Fins are olive and sometimes tinted with red. The pectoral fins are far forward and low on the body.

Habitat and behavior 

Tui chubs are found in a variety of habitats, including anything from small streams to large lakes and reservoirs, and both high cold lakes, such as Lake Tahoe, and warmer desert streams.

They spawn between late April and early August, depending on temperatures. In Pyramid Lake the peak season is June; males move inshore first, then congregate around arriving females in shallow water, preferring areas of heavy vegetation. The female scatters her eggs randomly over a wide area, where they are then fertilized by several males. The hatchlings remain in the heavy vegetation for the remainder of the summer. In Lake Tahoe some chubs spawn around stream mouths in July.

Tui chub diet is varied; young fish eat mostly invertebrates, adding plant material and especially algae as they mature. Habits also vary by location and the fineness of the gill rakers, so for instance fine-rakered forms in Pyramid Lake feed more on plankton in open water than the coarse-rakered forms, which live near the bottom and eats more plants and algae. The largest individuals will eat other fish also. In Pyramid Lake the endangered Lahontan cutthroat trout feeds on the tui chub; the Lahontan cutthroat trout has been studied extensively due to water management decisions affecting the water quality of the Truckee River and Pyramid Lake.

Subspecies 

The exact number of subspecies is not known; Sigler & Sigler estimate as high as 16. Agreed subspecies include:

 Siphateles bicolor bicolor
 Siphateles bicolor isolata
 Siphateles bicolor mohavensis
 Siphateles bicolor obesa
 Siphateles bicolor pectinifer
 Siphateles bicolor snyderi

See also
 Truckee River

References

 C.M.Hogan, Marc Papineau et al., Development of a dynamic water quality simulation model for the Truckee River, Earth Metrics Inc., Environmental Protection Agency Technology Series Washington D.C. (1987)
 William F. Sigler and John W. Sigler, Fishes of the Great Basin (Reno: University of Nevada Press, 1987), pp. 166–170

Chubs (fish)
Siphateles
Fish described in 1856
Taxa named by Charles Frédéric Girard
Fish of the Western United States
Fish of the Pacific Ocean
Fish of North America
Fauna of the Mojave Desert
Fauna of the Great Basin
Fauna of the Sierra Nevada (United States)